Linnormegget Hill is a rock hill  south of the Linnormen Hills in the Payer Mountains of Queen Maud Land, Antarctica. It was photographed from the air by the Third German Antarctic Expedition (1938–39), and was mapped by Norwegian cartographers from surveys and air photos by the Sixth Norwegian Antarctic Expedition (1956–60) and named Linnormegget (the dragon's egg).

References

Hills of Queen Maud Land
Princess Astrid Coast